Stephen Arsenault (born September 6, 1988) is a Canadian ice sledge hockey player.

Arsenault was born in Hamilton, Ontario to Joe and Jill Arsenault. He has avascular necrosis of the femoral head.

He began his sledge hockey career in 2004 in Edmonton with the Paralympic Sports Association Dogs. He also played for the Edmonton Impact sledge hockey team. He took a hiatus from sledge hockey from 2007 to 2010, a timespan in which his mother died and his father was seriously injured in a workplace accident which resulted in amputation of a leg.

With the Canada men's national ice sledge hockey team, He won a gold medal at the IPC Ice Sledge Hockey World Championships in 2011, 2013, 2017 and a silver in 2012. He also competed in the Sochi 2014 Winter Paralympics with the Canadian national team, winning a bronze in the sledge hockey tournament.

He is currently General Manager and Head Coach of the Gibbons Pioneers Junior A team. He resides in Spruce Grove, Alberta. He is no longer a personal trainer.

References

External links 
 
 

1988 births
Living people
Canadian sledge hockey players
Paralympic sledge hockey players of Canada
Paralympic bronze medalists for Canada
Ice sledge hockey players at the 2014 Winter Paralympics
Para ice hockey players at the 2018 Winter Paralympics
Medalists at the 2014 Winter Paralympics
Medalists at the 2018 Winter Paralympics
Paralympic medalists in sledge hockey
Sportspeople from Hamilton, Ontario